Achromadoridae is a family of nematodes belonging to the order Chromadorida.

Genera:
 Achromadora Cobb, 1913
 Paradoxolaimus Kreis, 1924
 Kreisonema Khera, 1969

References

Nematodes